Mert Can (born 9 October 1993) is a Turkish footballer who plays as a centre-back for Mersin İdman Yurdu. He made his Süper Lig debut on 13 April 2013.

References

External links
 Player profile at TFF.org

1993 births
Living people
Sportspeople from Mersin
Turkish footballers
Mersin İdman Yurdu footballers
Süper Lig players
Association football central defenders

Association football defenders
21st-century Turkish women